Absberg is a municipality in the Weißenburg-Gunzenhausen district, in Bavaria, Germany.

The Absberg family was named by this place and had their home castle there.

References

Weißenburg-Gunzenhausen